Isis, minor planet designation: 42 Isis, is a large main-belt asteroid, measuring 100.2 km in diameter with a stony (S-type) composition. It was discovered by English astronomer N.R. Pogson on 23 May 1856 at Oxford, and was his first asteroid discovery. The asteroid's name was chosen by Manuel John Johnson, director of the Radcliffe Observatory in Oxford. Although Isis is the name of an Egyptian goddess, the name was chosen in homage to Pogson's astronomer daughter, (Elizabeth) Isis Pogson. In addition, the Isis is the stretch of the River Thames that runs through Oxford.

This asteroid is orbiting the Sun with a period of 3.82 years. The light curve inversion technique, when applied to photometric observations of this asteroid, show multiple local irregularities. The overall shape displays little elongation, with a ratio between the major and minor axes equal to 1.1. The measured rotation period for this model is 13.6 hours. The spectrum of 42 Isis reveals the strong presence of the mineral Olivine, a relative rarity in the asteroid belt.

References

External links 
 
 

S-type asteroids (Tholen)
L-type asteroids (SMASS)
Background asteroids
Isis
Isis
18560523